Haikou Meilan International Airport  is the airport serving Haikou, the capital of Hainan Province, China. The airport is operated by Hainan Meilan International Airport Company Limited.

Haikou Meilan International Airport is the largest and busiest airport in Hainan, the second busiest being Sanya Phoenix International Airport. In 2019, the passenger throughput was 24.216 million, ranking 17th among China's civil airports; the cargo throughput reached about 175,600 tons, ranking 19th; the aircraft movement was about 164,800, ranking 22nd.

Construction Process

Initial Construction
Hainan Province was established in 1988. As Haikou City is the provincial capital, its development plan is put on the agenda. At that time, Haikou Dayingshan Airport could not be expanded because it was located in the city center and could not meet future needs. On the other hand, it also severely restricts the development and construction of Haikou. The construction of a new airport became a major issue of priority at the time.

In 1993, the State Council and the Central Military Commission agreed to establish a project to build Meilan Airport. In May 1996, the State Planning Commission approved the airport project budget, and construction started in November of the same year.

Passed the national inspection and acceptance in March 1999 and qualified for sailing. On May 13 of the same year, the Civil Aviation Administration of China issued a reply for the opening of Meilan Airport, and it was officially put into operation on the 25th.

After the completion of the airport, in order to meet the increasing demand of passengers, the east/west side corridors of the T1 terminal were expanded in 2002 and 2014 respectively. The terminal building was expanded in 2003. After the expansion, the terminal area reached 102,000 square meters, with a design capacity of 9.3 million passengers per year, 135,000 tons of cargo and mail, and 50,000 flights. The international terminal was also put into use in 2014, and the aviation tourism city/transportation center and the new airport hotel were also put into use in 2018.

The airport terminal has 60,200 square metres of space, with 45 check-in counters and 11 security checkpoints. The airport is staffed by 565 employees.

A new, international terminal opened on August 14, 2013. Situated at the east side of the existing terminal, this new apron increases international capacity to ten flights, from the previous capacity of three. Construction of this new terminal began on April 18, 2011.

Second phase
In order to meet the increasing passenger flow demand, the second phase of the project was launched in 2016.

The newly built flight area of this project is located directly to the north, and parallel to the main part. It has a rating of 4F, and a new 3,600 (11,811 feet) long runway (10/28), two parallel taxiways and contact road system are built. A total investment of 14.468 billion yuan will be made in the construction of a new T2 terminal covering 296,000 square meters and various types of platforms with 59 seats. The construction target of the project is to meet the annual passenger throughput of 35 million person-times and annual freight and postal throughput of 400,000 tons by 2025.

The project was scheduled to be basically completed in December 2018. The installation and commissioning of electro-mechanical equipment was scheduled to begin in 2019 and to be put into use at the end of that year.

Third phase
In 2020, Haikou City will start planning the third phase expansion project of Meilan Airport. It plans to build a corridor on the east side of the T1 and T2 terminals, and build a short runway on the north side and expand supporting facilities, etc., and strive to start construction in 2021 .

Facilities

Terminal 1
Terminal 1 covers an area of approximately 150,000 square meters and has 74 check-in counters. Among them, counters 1-16 are dedicated to Hainan Airlines, counters 17-36 are dedicated to Capital Airlines, Tianjin Airlines, Lucky Air, West Air, Beibu Gulf Airlines, Chang'an Airlines, Fortune Wings Airlines, Guilin Airlines, Fuzhou Airlines, and Urumqi Airlines, 37 -Counter 58 is used by airlines other than China Southern Airlines and Chongqing Airlines, and counters 59-74 are dedicated counters for China Southern Airlines and Chongqing Airlines. There are 27 bridges in the terminal building, with duty-free shops, lounges and other facilities inside.

Terminal 2
The newly built Terminal 2 is 296,000 square meters, of which the basement floor is the staff and logistics floor, the first floor is for baggage claim and arrival vehicles, the second floor is the arrival floor, the third floor is the departure floor, and the third floor is the departure floor. The fourth floor includes first class, business class lounge and passenger dining hall. At the same time, large gardens and parks are also designed inside the terminal building. It is used to display various local plants and greenhouse plants as the natural symbol of the island.

International Terminal
The International Passenger Transport Building covers an area of 13,200 square meters without bridges.

Apron
The apron of Terminal 1 of the airport is designed according to the 4E standard. There is a 3600mx45m runway with a PCN value of 95/R/B/W/T. The terminal 09 is equipped with a Type II instrument landing system, and the terminal 27 is equipped with a Type I instrument landing system. There are also two taxiways of 3600mx23m and corresponding connecting lanes. The area is 790,000 square meters, with 78 stands (5 D-level stands, 8 E-level stands, and the rest are C stands). The second phase of the newly built flight area has a grade index of 4F, and a new runway with a length of 3,600 meters, two parallel taxiways and a connecting road system will be built. After completion, Meilan Airport will form two flight zones in the south and north, with the flight zone levels being 4E and 4F respectively.

Other Facilities
Meilan Airport Duty Free Shop is located in the isolation area of T1 and T2 terminals of the airport with business hours 6:00 – 23:00. There are also various restaurants, cafes, supermarkets, etc. to choose from inside and outside the airport.

The ground transportation is located on the north side of Terminal 1, with a construction area of 322,300 square meters, including a hotel building with a construction area of 99,000 square meters, a commercial parking building with a construction area of 223,300 square meters, and 1040 hotel rooms. There are about 5000 parking spaces for motor vehicles (including open-air parking lots).

Both Hainan Airlines and China Southern Airlines have bases and maintenance depots at Meilan Airport. The maintenance warehouse can meet the maintenance requirements of Boeing 787 and Airbus A330 and lower aircraft.

Transportation

Highway
At present, there are national highway G223 and S82 airport connecting expressway connecting the urban area and the airport, and the provincial highway S201 to the west connects the airport with Guilinyang and the towns along the way.

Railway
Hainan Island High-speed Rail Meilan Station is located on the basement level of the Meilan Airport terminal. From here, you can take the city area train (the train number starts with S) and the round-the-island high-speed rail intercity train (the train number starts with C) to the downtown area of Haikou. Intercity trains in some counties and cities in Hainan Province, including Sanya City.

High-speed rail:

East Loop Line: Haikou East Station-Meilan Station-Wenchang Station-Qionghai Station-Boao Station-Wanning Station-Shenzhou Station-Lingshui Station-Yalong Bay Station-Sanya Station

West Loop Line: Haikou Station-Laocheng Town Station-Fushan Town Station-Lingao South Station-Yintan Station-Baimajing Station-Qiziwan Station-Dongfang Station-Jinyue Bay-Jianfeng Station-Huangliu Station-Ledong Station-Ya Zhou Station-Phoenix Airport Station-Sanya Station

City train:

Meilan Station → Haikou East Station → Chengxi Station → Xiuying Station → Changliu Station → Haikou Station

Haikou Station → Changliu Station → Xiuying Station → Chengxi Station → Haikou East Station → Meilan Station

Taxi
Getting to the airport from Haikou city by taxi usually costs about RMB 60 and takes about 30 minutes.

Airport shuttle bus

Intercity bus

Busses
There are 5 lines running between the urban area, Guilinyang University Park and the airport.

Route 21: To Baishamen Park, charge by section. min ¥1, max ¥5

Route 41: To Haikou Port, charge by section. min ¥1, max ¥6. (There is also an express route for min ¥2)

Route K4: To Baishamen Park, it is an express route, and the fare is divided. min ¥3, max ¥6

Route 218: to Guilinyang Tropical Agricultural Park, tolls are to be paid in sections. min ¥2, and max is ¥6.

Route 219: to Guilin Yangtze University District, charge by section. min ¥2, max ¥6

Airlines and destinations

Passenger

Cargo

See also
List of airports in China
China's busiest airports by passenger traffic

References

External links

 Official website

Buildings and structures in Haikou
Airports in Hainan
Airports established in 1999
1999 establishments in China